Fort Lauderdale/Hollywood International Airport at Dania Beach, or more commonly Fort Lauderdale Airport, is a Tri-Rail commuter rail station in Dania Beach, Florida, located just west of Fort Lauderdale–Hollywood International Airport.

The station is located at Gulfstream Way, just west of the confluence of I-95 and Griffin Road (SR 818).  Opened on August 14, 2000, the current station replaced the original and now-demolished Fort Lauderdale Airport station 0.7 miles/1.1 km to the south, which operated from 1989 through 2000 and which had previously served as the Dania Seaboard Air Line Railway station.

When the Tri-Rail system was first under construction, the station was located directly west of the airport's main runway, west of and next to I-95. However, concerns by the Federal Aviation Administration about the height of the platform when planes were on approach prevented the station from ever being opened and moved to the Tigertail Avenue location. Remnants of both defunct stations remain adjacent to the tracks.

Station layout
The station has two side platforms. A parking garage is located west of the southbound platform, while a small parking lot is east of the northbound platform. A sidewalk grade crossing connects between the two platforms at the north end of the station.

References

External links
South Florida Regional Transportation Authority - Fort Lauderdale/Hollywood International Airport at Dania Beach

Tri-Rail stations in Broward County, Florida
Railway stations in the United States opened in 1989
Railway stations in the United States opened in 2000
Airport railway stations in the United States
2000 establishments in Florida
Station